Ho Kham (เทศบาลตำบลหอคำ) is a subdistrict municipality (Thesaban Tambon) in Mueang Bueng Kan District, Bueng Kan Province, Thailand. The municipality covers the whole subdistrict Ho Kham. It covers an area of 
40.04 km2 and 14 administrative villages. As of 2012, it has a total population of 7,116 people.

History
The local administration was created as a subdistrict administrative organization (TAO) in 1996. Effective July 18, 2008 it was upgraded to a subdistrict municipality.

References

Geography of Bueng Kan province